The canton of Giromagny is an administrative division of the Territoire de Belfort department, northeastern France. Its borders were modified at the French canton reorganisation which came into effect in March 2015. Its seat is in Giromagny.

It consists of the following communes:

Anjoutey 
Auxelles-Bas
Auxelles-Haut
Bourg-sous-Châtelet
Chaux
Étueffont
Felon
Giromagny
Grosmagny
Lachapelle-sous-Chaux
Lachapelle-sous-Rougemont
Lamadeleine-Val-des-Anges
Lepuix
Leval
Petitefontaine 
Petitmagny
Riervescemont
Romagny-sous-Rougemont
Rougegoutte
Rougemont-le-Château
Saint-Germain-le-Châtelet
Vescemont

References

Cantons of the Territoire de Belfort